The Executive Towers is a complex of 12 towers in Business Bay development in Dubai, United Arab Emirates. They comprise 10 residential towers, one commercial tower known as Aspect Tower, and one hotel tower 'The Taj Hotel'. They are the first buildings to be completed in Business Bay, and are located near its entrance.

A three-storey podium connects all the towers in addition to the nearby Vision Tower, which is going to be connected by a special passage. The third level (Plaza Level) is called The Courtyard, it contains communal facilities, landscaped plazas, children’s play areas, fountain yards, courtyards, and covered walking arcades.

Towers
The complex consists of twelve skyscrapers:

Progress

The towers are complete with also parks, water fountains and car parking space.  In addition, the Executive Tower Hotel at the end of the podium, had stalled pending obtaining financing for the fit out. The Hotel was taken over by the Taj Hotel chain and opened its doors early 2015.

Footnotes

See also
 List of tallest buildings in Dubai
 List of tallest buildings in the United Arab Emirates

External links

Executive Towers Official Site 
Executive Towers page on Dubai Properties' site
Executive Towers on Emporis.com

Office buildings completed in 2010
Residential buildings completed in 2010
Hotel buildings completed in 2010
Residential skyscrapers in Dubai
Skyscraper hotels in Dubai
Skyscraper office buildings in Dubai